Gum may refer to:

Types of gum
 Adhesive
 Bubble gum
 Chewing gum
 Gum (botany), sap or other resinous material associated with certain species of the plant kingdom
 Gum arabic, made from the sap of Acacia senegal, an Old World tree species
 Gum copal, resin produced from the sap of Daniellia, a genus of Afrotropical forest trees
 Gum ghatti, made from the sap of Anogeissus latifolia, an Asian tree species
 Gum guaicum, substance produced from Guaiacum officinale, a neotropical tree species
 Gum guar, made from the seeds of guar, Cyamopsis tetragonoloba, an Old World annual legume
 Gum karaya, made from the sap of Sterculia urens, an Asian tree species
 Spruce gum from the resin of spruce trees
 Kauri gum, from the fossilized resin of Kauri trees
 Locust bean gum, made from the seeds of carob, Ceratonia siliqua
 Xanthan gum, a common food thickener and stabilizer
 Gum base, the provides the basic textural and masticatory properties of chewing and bubble gums
 Gum metal, titanium alloy with high elasticity
 Postage stamp gum, substance applied to the back of a stamp to enable it to adhere to a letter
 Spirit gum, used to affix applications to the body

People
 Gum (footballer) (born 1986), Brazilian footballer
 Gum Mo-jam, military leader
 Allen Gum (born 1969), American college baseball coach
 Jay Watson (born 1991),  GUM, Australian musician

Places
 Guam, ISO-3166-1 alpha-3 and IOC country code
 Guam International Airport (IATA airport code: GUM)
 Gum (crater), lunar impact crater
 Gum-Gum, township in Malaysia
 Gum Springs, Arkansas
 Gum Wall, a brick wall covered in used chewing gum in Seattle
 White Gum Valley, Western Australia
 The Old Gum Tree in Glenelg North, South Australia

Science
 Gum bichromate, 19th-century photographic printing process
 Gum depigmentation, a procedure used in cosmetic dentistry
 Gum over platinum, a chemical photographic process
 Gums, or gingiva, the soft tissue partly covering teeth
 Genitourinary medicine, deals with reproductive problems

Entertainment
 "The Gum", episode of the comedy television show Seinfield
 Glasgow University Magazine, in Scotland
 Mr. Gum, central character in a series of novels for children by Andy Stanton
 Gum (character), a playable character from the Jet Set Radio video game franchise
 Gums, a character in the British comic Monster Fun
 Great Uncle Matthew, a character in the novel Ballet Shoes by Noel Streatfeild
 Gum, a character from the 2016 adult animated film Sausage Party
 Gum Girl, a protagonist The Gumazing Gum Girl! book series by Rhode Montijo

Other uses
 GUM (department store), in Moscow, Russia
 Global United Media, Indian film company
 Gum Air, an airline in Paramaribo, Suriname
 Gum languages of New Guinea
 Gum tree, any of various related species of Eucalypt trees
 Guide to the Expression of Uncertainty in Measurement, known as the GUM, a metrology guide pertaining to measurement uncertainty
GUM, a business unit of the Sunstar Group which designs and manufactures dental cleaning tools like toothbrushes and gum stimulators

See also
 Gummy (disambiguation)
 Gum-digger, a person who dug for kauri gum in New Zealand
 Gumball (disambiguation)
 Gumshoe (disambiguation)